André Damien (10 July 1930 – 5 March 2019) was a French lawyer and politician who served as the head of the French Bar Association.

A Supreme Court Justice of France from 1981 until 1997, he also served as Mayor of Versailles as well as being elected a Deputy in the National Assembly.

Damien authored numerous works on legal and historical matters.

Damien died on 5 March 2019 at the age of 88.

Elected offices 
 Mayor of Versailles (1977–95)
 Counsellor-General for Yvelines (1979–98)
 Deputy for Yvelines (1996–97).

Honours 
  Grand officier, Légion d'honneur
  Commandeur, ordre national du Mérite
  Commandeur, ordre des Palmes académiques
  Commandeur, ordre du Mérite agricole
  Commandeur, ordre des Arts et Lettres
  Grand Cross, pro Merito Melitensi.

References

External links 
 Académie des sciences morales et politiques
 Académie de Versailles

1930 births
2019 deaths
Politicians from Paris
People from Versailles
University of Paris alumni
Members of the Conseil d'État (France)
French Roman Catholics
Knights of Malta
Grand Officiers of the Légion d'honneur
Commanders of the Ordre national du Mérite
Commanders of the Order of Agricultural Merit
Recipients of the Ordre des Palmes Académiques
Commandeurs of the Ordre des Arts et des Lettres
Recipients of the Order pro Merito Melitensi
20th-century French politicians
20th-century French lawyers
Mayors of places in Île-de-France